The following is a list of the 17 cantons of the Vosges department, in France, following the French canton reorganisation which came into effect in March 2015:

 La Bresse
 Bruyères
 Charmes
 Darney
 Épinal-1
 Épinal-2
 Gérardmer
 Golbey
 Mirecourt
 Neufchâteau
 Raon-l'Étape
 Remiremont
 Saint-Dié-des-Vosges-1
 Saint-Dié-des-Vosges-2
 Le Thillot
 Le Val-d'Ajol
 Vittel

References